Jason Szep is an American journalist with Reuters who received the Pulitzer Prize in 2014.

Early life and education
Born in Scituate, Massachusetts in 1969, Szep is the son of two-time Pulitzer Prize-winning political cartoonist Paul Szep, formerly of The Boston Globe. Jason Szep graduated from Brookline High School and studied literature at Bard College and University of Toronto.

Career
Szep has reported from across Asia and North America on a wide range of subjects since joining Reuters in Toronto in 1990, with postings in Sydney, Hong Kong, Singapore, Tokyo, Boston, Bangkok and Washington. His roles at Reuters have included Boston Bureau Chief, Southeast Asia Bureau Chief, International Affairs Editor, and U.S. National Affairs Editor in Washington. Szep is currently International Political Investigations Editor.

Awards
Szep won the 2014 Pulitzer Prize for International Reporting along with Andrew Marshall for their reports on the violent persecution of the Rohingya, a Muslim minority in Myanmar.

Other honors for his reporting include three Awards for Editorial Excellence by the Society of Publishers in Asia, an Osborn Elliott Prize, two Society of Professional Journalists' Sigma Delta Chi awards, a Deadline Club award and a White House Correspondents Association Edgar A. Poe Memorial Award.

References

1969 births
Living people
Journalists from Massachusetts
American male journalists
21st-century American journalists
University of Toronto alumni
Reuters people
People from Scituate, Massachusetts
Bard College alumni
20th-century American journalists
21st-century American male writers
20th-century American male writers
Pulitzer Prize for International Reporting winners